Matti Kuusimäki (born May 3, 1943 in Turku, Finland) is the former Prosecutor General of Finland. In 2010, he was succeeded by Matti Nissinen.

References

20th-century Finnish lawyers
Prosecutors
1943 births
Living people
People from Turku
21st-century Finnish lawyers